The Death Of Tragedy is the seventh album by steampunk band Abney Park. It was a turning point from their earlier industrial goth sound to the steampunk-influenced neoclassical dark wave genre that made the band successful. The artwork is a shot of the Red Fort, where the singer and songwriter Robert Brown lived when he was a kid.

Track listing
"Stigmata Martyr"
"The Wrong Side"
"Dear Ophelia"
"Witch Cult"
"Sacrilege"
"All The Myths Are True"
"Death Of The Hero"
"Love"
"Downtrodden"
"False Prophecy"

Credits
 Robert Brown - Songs, vocals, Dumbek
 Kristina Erickson - Keyboards
 Traci Nemeth - Vocals
 Rob Hazelton - Guitar
 Krysztof Nemeth - Bass

Guest artists
 Nathen Rollins - Violin
 Lyssa Browne - Reporter
 Bill Owens - Anchorman

References 
  Discogs, 2005

2005 albums
Abney Park (band) albums